The 1899 California Golden Bears football team was an American football team that represented the University of California, Berkeley during the 1899 college football season. The team competed as an independent under head coach Garrett Cochran and compiled a record of 7–1–1.

For just the second time in history, an eastern team traveled to the Pacific coast. Carlisle defeated California by a score of 2–0. The news reported the contest as the first matchup of East and West, but was pre-dated by the 1894 Chicago vs. Stanford football game. Like the Chicago vs. Stanford game before it, the Carlisle vs. California game foreshadows the first bowl game, the 1902 Rose Bowl.

Schedule

References

California
California Golden Bears football seasons
California Golden Bears football